Estonian airline Nordica operates out of its hub at Tallinn Airport. Since starting Nordica has served the following destinations. The airline began flights to eight destinations in November 2015, with its first flight taking off for Amsterdam. Other initial destinations included Brussels, Copenhagen, Stockholm, Oslo, Kyiv, Trondheim, and Vilnius. All scheduled routes were terminated by October 2019 to focus on wetlease operations.

Destinations

References

Nordica